Charles C. Lovell (born September 10, 1929) is a senior United States district judge of the United States District Court for the District of Montana.

Education and career

Born in Anaconda, Montana, Lovell received a Bachelor of Science degree from the University of Montana in 1952 and was in the United States Air Force from 1952 to 1954, thereafter receiving a Juris Doctor from the University of Montana School of Law in 1959. He was in private practice in Helena, Montana from 1959 to 1985. He was chief counsel to the Office of Montana State Attorney General, Appellate Division from 1969 to 1972.

Federal judicial service

On March 27, 1985, Lovell was nominated by President Ronald Reagan to a new seat on the United States District Court for the District of Montana created by 98 Stat. 333. He was confirmed by the United States Senate on April 3, 1985, and received his commission on April 4, 1985. He assumed senior status on June 14, 2000. He took inactive senior status on April 7, 2021.

Notable Cases:

1.  GUN CONTROL.  Printz v. United States, 854 F.Supp. 1503 (D. Mont. 1994); rev'd sub nom Mack v. United States, 66 F.3d 1025 (9th Cir. 1995), aff'd Printz v. United States, 521 U.S. 898 (1997).  Lovell held that certain provisions of the Brady Handgun Violence Prevention Act were unconstitutional in requiring state law enforcement officers to conduct background checks of handgun transferees.  He was reversed by the Ninth Circuit Court of Appeals, which was reversed in turn by the United States Supreme Court on a 5–4 vote in June 1997.

2.  UNABOMBER.  "United States v. Kaczynski", 6:96mj06-CCL.  In 1996, Lovell issued a search warrant for the property of Ted Kaczynski (known as the "Unabomber") near Lincoln, Montana.  He also gave Kaczynski his first appearance in federal court and unsealed the search warrant documents upon the petition of NBC, NYTimes, Denver Post, and LA Times.  Kaczynski's motion to dismiss charges due to FBI leaks was denied after hearing, and both the Ninth Circuit Court of Appeals and U.S. Supreme Court declined to hear Kaczynski's appeal.  Hearing was held on government's motion to transfer case, and case was then transferred to the Eastern District of California for prosecution.  Various other orders were entered in preservation and transfer of evidence.

3.  MONTANA FREEMEN.  "United States v. Leroy Schweitzer", 2:91cr08-CCL (failure to file income taxes); 4:92cr28 (failure to appear in district court).  In 1996, Lovell tried Leroy Schweitzer in two successive jury trials, both resulting in convictions.  Schweitzer was a leader of the group known as the Montana Freemen, an anti-government, Christian Patriot group that held an 81-day armed standoff with FBI agents outside the town of Jordan, Montana.  Lovell recused himself from other cases pending against Schweitzer due to alleged threats made by Schweitzer against court personnel.  Schweitzer died in federal prison in 2011.  In 2000, Lovell tried "United States v. Dale Thomas Klock", 4:99cr70, on charges of bank fraud.  Klock was the Mayor of Cascade, Montana, and he attended Montana Freemen 'school' and adopted their ideology.  Klock attempted to deposit fraudulent money orders in the amounts of $10 million and $5 million to a local bank in his community, in an effort to further the Freemen cause.

4.  PRISONER RIGHTS.  "Murphy v. Shaw", 195 F.3d 1121 (9th Cir. 1999), "rev'd by Shaw v. Murphy", 532 U.S. 223 (2001).  In 1997, Lovell held that inmates have limited First Amendment rights and the fact that an inmate's communication purported to give legal advice did not shield it from prison discipline.  The Ninth Circuit reversed and was in turn reversed by the U.S. Supreme Court.

5.  EXIT POLLING.  "National Broadcasting Company v. Colburg", 699 f. Supp. 241 (D. Mont. 1988).  Lovell granted preliminary injunction and judgment on the pleadings to plaintiff, holding that Montana statute setting a ban on exit polling within 200 feet of polling places was unconstitutional under the First Amendment as a content-based and impermissible regulation of political speech.

6.  PRISON RIOT TRIAL.  In 1998, Lovell presided over the "Prison Riot Trial", a civil jury trial brought by numerous inmates who were incarcerated in the Montana State Prison during the 1991 prison riot.  (During the riot, five inmates were slain, including four informants, over a period of four hours when the inmates took control of the maximum-security building.  Fifteen inmates were convicted in state courts of offenses relating to the riot.)  Following the riot, inmates sued the prison, alleging improper and unnecessary use of force against inmates during the days following the riot, and 13 inmates went to trial before  Lovell.  The jury found that five inmates were abused after the riot and awarded them a total of $5,103.  Other inmates claims that did not go to trial were settled by the State of Montana for a total of $5,750.

7.  YELLOWSTONE PARK BISON.  From 1985 through 2013, Lovell handled numerous cases relating to the bison population in Yellowstone Park:  "Fund for Animals v. Hodel (Fund for Animals I) (1985)".  "Fund for Animals v. Lujan (Fund for Animals II) (1991)".  "Greater Yellowstone Coalition v. Babbitt" (1996).  "Intertribal Bison Cooperative v. Babbitt" (1998).  "State of Montana and Fund for Animals (Intervenor) v. USDOI, USDA, and Royal Teton Ranch (Intervenor)" (2001).  "Cold Mountain, Cold Rivers v. Garber" (2003).  "Western Watersheds Project v. Salazar" (2011).  "Alliance for the Wild Rockies v. USDA" (2013).

References

Sources
 

1929 births
Living people
Judges of the United States District Court for the District of Montana
United States district court judges appointed by Ronald Reagan
20th-century American judges
United States Air Force airmen
University of Montana alumni
People from Anaconda, Montana
21st-century American judges